The barred rail (Hypotaenidia torquata) is a species of rail found across the Philippines, Sulawesi (Indonesia) and Salawati (western New Guinea). The species is common, but shy and difficult to see.

References

 A Guide to the birds of the philippines(2000) Robert S. Kennedy pedro C. Gonzales, Edward C, Dickinson Hector C. Miranda, jr. & Timothy H. Fisher

External links

barred rail
Birds of the Philippines
Birds of Sulawesi
Birds of Western New Guinea
barred rail
Taxa named by Carl Linnaeus
Taxonomy articles created by Polbot